Kovpak is a surname. Notable people with the surname include:

 Basil Kovpak (born 1967), Ukrainian priest 
 Lev Kovpak (born 1978), Russian politician
 Oleksandr Kovpak (born 1983), Ukrainian footballer
 Sydir Kovpak  (1887–1967), Soviet partisan

See also
 

Ukrainian-language surnames